Stateway Gardens was a Chicago Housing Authority (CHA) public housing project located in the Bronzeville neighborhood on the South Side of Chicago, Illinois.

It was located alongside the Dan Ryan Expressway, adjacently north of the former Robert Taylor Homes, and was part of the State Street Corridor that included other CHA properties: Robert Taylor Homes, Dearborn Homes, Harold Ickes Homes and Hillard Homes. Stateway Gardens was home to people living in mid- and high-rise apartment buildings.

Finished by the late 1950s, Stateway Gardens was plagued by a large amount of gang violence, organized crime, and drug abuse. The area gradually became more neglected and underserved by city authorities and the local police department throughout its existence which led to mass abandonment and urban decay. Consequently, the housing project was fully demolished in 2007.

Construction
In 1955, construction at Stateway Gardens commenced, with 1,644 units planned in eight high-rise buildings. The total cost for the project was $22 million. Three years later, construction was complete and approximately 3,000 people moved in. In 1978, a major CHA renovation plan costing $106.2 million was undertaken. This project rehabilitated Stateway Gardens, Robert Taylor Homes and most of the ABLA Homes on Chicago's Near West Side.

Problems and crime
In August, 1984, Stateway Gardens was within the six poorest U.S. census tracts, according to a Roosevelt University study. Cabrini–Green on the North Side ranked seventh in the same study. Amid rising crime in CHA developments in the early 1980s, the Chicago Police Department launched a Public Housing Crime Unit to replace private security guards at those sites. In 1988, (prior to the forming of the CHA Police Department) the South Side's Wentworth Police District (which included Stateway Gardens and the Robert Taylor Homes) had 67 homicides, the highest of any district in the city. Stateway Gardens was infamous for its high rate of violent crime and drug activity through the late 1990s.

Re-Organization
The federal government created Housing Opportunities for People Everywhere (known as HOPE VI) in 1993 as a way to provide funds for cities to demolish dilapidated public-housing units and replace them with mixed-income communities. In 1987, federal officials seized control of all Chicago Housing Authority holdings and property amid allegations of corruption and graft. The CHA would remain under federal receivership until 2010.

Demolition

In 1996, demolition of Cabrini–Green began. This marked the start of what eventually came to be known as the Chicago Housing Authority's Plan for Transformation. One year later, demolition began at the Robert Taylor Homes. In 2000, the CHA formally approved the 10-year Plan for Transformation to remake public housing and demolition began at Stateway Gardens in 2001. In October 2006, families living in the last remaining building (3651–53 S. Federal St.) at Stateway Gardens were scheduled to leave. The building was finally demolished in June 2007, making way for Phase 1 of the mixed income development Park Boulevard, half of which was already completed prior to the demolition and resident relocation processes. The CHA used its One Strike department to determine who would quality for Section 8 relocation.

Notable residents
 Ronnie Lester, University of Iowa All American, NBA Player for Chicago Bulls and Los Angeles Lakers, NBA Scout for Los Angeles Lakers and Phoenix Suns.

References

Public housing in Chicago
South Side, Chicago
Residential skyscrapers in Chicago
Demolished buildings and structures in Illinois
Former buildings and structures in Chicago
Urban decay in the United States
1955 establishments in Illinois
2007 disestablishments in Illinois
Residential buildings completed in 1955
Buildings and structures demolished in 2007